Iceberg is an original novel written by David Banks and based on the long-running British science fiction television series Doctor Who. It was number 18 (of 61) in the Virgin New Adventures range and featured the Cybermen, being a sequel to the serials The Invasion and The Tenth Planet. The events of the novel run concurrently with those of Birthright. Banks as an actor portrayed the Cyber Leader in several Doctor Who serials. A prelude to the novel, also penned by Banks, appeared in Doctor Who Magazine #204.

This was the first original Doctor Who novel to feature the Cybermen, and the first New Adventure to feature a recurring foe from the television series.

Audio adaptation
In 1994 David Banks recorded his novel for Talking Books. It contains 35 chapters, and runs to around 9 hours.

Plot
Following their betrayal by Tobias Vaughn and the failure of their planned invasion of Earth, a group of Cybermen crashes in Antarctica while fleeing the destruction of their mothership. Some years later, in 1986, a second Cyberman incursion is foiled and their home world Mondas is destroyed in the process. But the truth is covered up, and life goes on. Software engineer Philip Duvall is paralysed in a hit-and-run accident, but the fleeing motorcyclist knows that he will bear the guilt for the rest of his life. Scientist Pamela Cutler learns that her unresolved issues with her domineering father will never be resolved; he has been killed in action at the South Pole, and the events leading up to his death have been classified. And Sergeant Dave Hilliard arrives in Antarctica to clean up after whatever it was that happened at Snowcap Tracking Station—and finds more than he bargained for.

Twenty years later, investigative journalist Ruby Duvall, Phillip's daughter, sets off on an Antarctic tour on the SS Elysium, a pleasure cruise sponsored by the Australian billionaire Sir Stanley Straker (“The Wizard of Oz”). She is going undercover to avoid attention, but it will be a working holiday; she will be writing about the cruise for the Sunday Seeker, and testing her Nanocom dictation machine and a tiny holocamera as she does so. Ruby soon makes new friends on the cruise; a Canadian woman named Barbara teaches her the martial art Pah T’wa, and the ship's entertainers, Diana and Leslie, tell her about the Wizard of Oz cabaret they’ll be staging. However, Ruby finds it difficult to get close to moody artist Michael Brack, who has been hired to sculpt icebergs into caricatures of the ship's passengers using a decommissioned Army laser. Brack is studying Heidegger, and believes that society should work towards becoming more efficient and machine-like. As the cruise proceeds, Ruby also finds him studying a book on cybernetics, and comes to suspect that he's up to something secret in the ship's hold. Diana and Leslie eventually learn Ruby's true identity and blab it about the ship before realising that she wanted to avoid attention, and when Brack realises who she really is he begins to act even more strangely. He seems to go out of his way to avoid her, but when she catches a glimpse of his cocktail napkin she finds that he's been obsessively drawing her face along with blueprints for a large cybernetic machine...

Pamela Cutler joined the Army after her father's death, and has risen to the rank of General. She has now been assigned to Snowcap Tracking Station, where scientists are working on a project named FLIPback, the human race's defense against the reversal of the Earth's magnetic polarity. In the event of such a shift, FLIPback will do just what its name suggests. Under Cutler's strict discipline, the project gets back on schedule - just on time, for the crew finds that true south is shifting out of position and realises that the reversal could occur within the year. While celebrating the successful completion of their work, Cutler finally gets to ask Lieutenant Hilliard what happened at Snowcap twenty years ago. He tells her what he's never told anyone before; about finding the remains of men in crumbling metal armour, and a spaceship which appeared to be falling apart and which had vanished by the time he got back to the landing site. He has never learned the whole truth; all he heard, after the fact, was that someone called “the Doctor” saved the world and then disappeared.

As the Elysium enters Antarctic waters, Brack carves an iceberg into a caricature of Straker's face, causing large ice chips or “growlers” to float through the water nearby. Ruby tries to interview Brack after his performance, but he departs without saying a word to her. Determined to find out what he's up to, Ruby uses her Nanocom to subvert the lift's security locks and get into the lower hold, where she finds Brack working on a large electronic machine. She flees before he can confront her, and returns to the upper decks, where Diana and Leslie are taking a break from rehearsing the cabaret. Leslie, feeling confined in his Tin Man costume, goes to a nearby porthole for a breath of fresh air—and sees the body of a man in armour, frozen inside one of the nearby growlers. Nobody believes him, however. Diana, learning of Ruby's interest in Brack, claims to have lived with him until recently—and also claims that before they broke up she found a letter implying that he and Straker were involved in smuggling arms to Panama. Ruby's curiosity gets the better of her once again, and she returns to the lower hold, where she finds crates marked “PANAMA”. She then hears an odd noise from the engine room, and while investigating she accidentally locks herself in with an apparent stowaway who calls himself “the Doctor”.

Weighted down with guilt and seeking to free himself from his past, the Doctor has departed from the TARDIS in a subset of the ship which takes the form of Lao Tzu's Jade Pagoda. Ruby isn’t sure what to make of the Doctor, but accompanies him when he finds a maintenance shaft leading out of the engine room up to the bridge. There, the captain and first mate also conclude that the Doctor must be a stowaway, and the Doctor, seeking to prove his credentials, learns that they are near Snowcap Tracking Station and asks to speak to General Cutler. It isn’t the same Cutler he was somehow expecting, but she proves to be very interested in hearing what he has to say for himself. Ruby still doesn’t believe the Doctor's claim to be a time traveller until she accompanies him into the Jade Pagoda, where he finds that his companions have disconnected the main TARDIS’ Time Vector Generator. When he puts it back in place the Jade Pagoda's interior dimensions are restored, much to Ruby's shock, but due to the disconnection of the TVG, the Jade Pagoda's structure is degrading, and it will be forced to return to the parent body of the TARDIS prematurely.

The celebrations at Snowcap are curtailed when Nike and Bono's exploration vehicle breaks down in the Torus Antarctica, a mysterious zone where entire survey teams have been known to vanish without trace. A rescue patrol is sent out, but Adler and Black return alone, seeming oddly subdued and claiming to have found the vehicle empty. The Doctor and Ruby then arrive, and the bewildered Hilliard shows Ruby about the base while the Doctor describes the Cyberman invasion to the incredulous Cutler. In the depths of Snowcap, Ruby stumbles across a tunnel carved out of the ice itself, and goes exploring. But he finds a base where the humans captured from the Torus Antarctica are being dissected and transformed into Cybermen. Ruby is captured by the Cybermen, who inject her with a metabolic stimulant to preserve her while they freeze her in the ice for future conversion. They also reveal that they intend to capture the Elysium, and transform its passengers and crew into Cybermen as well.

The Doctor arrives in search of Ruby, and creates a distraction, enabling her to escape. The Cybermen pursue them both, but the Doctor uses Ruby's holocam to create an illusion of a tunnel wall near a gap in the ice. The Cybermen pass through and plummet to their deaths. One of the Cybermen escapes the trap, but Ruby uses her knowledge of Pah T’wa to fling it through the gap as well. The Doctor is starting to suffer from hypothermia, but Ruby injects him with the same molecular “antifreeze” the Cybermen used on her, saving his life. They return to Snowcap to warn Cutler, but arrive too late; the Cybermen have already conditioned the soldiers in the base to obey their commands. They intend to sabotage the FLIPback field loop, and take over the Earth while the human race is disoriented by the effects of magnetic reversal.

Ruby and the Doctor return to the Elysium, where Ruby fetches a gold pendant from her cabin for use as a weapon. Brack then tries to confront her, but she flees, convinced that he's in league with the Cybermen. The Doctor heads to the bridge, to convince Captain Trench of the danger he faces, but Trench doesn’t believe him until it's too late. The iceberg which Brack had carved into the shape of Straker's head turns out to be a Cyberman base, and the Cybermen dock the iceberg with the Elysium and board. Much to the Doctor's and Ruby's surprise, Brack and Straker attempt to drive the Cybermen off with the ice-carving laser, but the Cybermen are armed with nerve gas and soon the passengers are unable to resist them. Brack breaks his leg falling from the deck, and the Cybermen leave him where he lies. The Doctor and Ruby try to avoid the Cybermen, but Ruby is pursued into the hold, where she accidentally knocks over the “PANAMA” crates and discovers that they contain hundreds of mannequin arms. The Cyberman tries to follow her through the pistons of the ship's engines, but falls out of step and is crushed. Ruby is reunited with the Doctor in the ship's ballroom, where the Wizard of Oz cabaret has been interrupted by the arrival of more than one Tin Man. There, they find Brack's secret project behind the curtains, a stage prop for the cabaret, nothing to do with the Cybermen at all.

The Cybermen capture the Doctor and Ruby and force them to transport the passengers and crew to their base in the Jade Pagoda. The Doctor is brought before the Cyber Controller, originally an immobile co-ordinator unit which has now acquired mobility by using the huge body of the Snowcap officer Bono. The Doctor drops Ruby's gold necklace into the Cybermen's processing equipment, but when it has no effect he apparently decides that there's no point fighting the Cybermen and willingly gives himself up for conversion. The Cybermen, believing that he has made the only logical decision, leave him unguarded, and he thus escapes and rescue Ruby. The reversal of the Earth's magnetic polarity is now imminent, but the crew of Snowcap are under Cyber control and a cobalt bomb has been placed in the reactor. The Doctor is recaptured before he can defuse the bomb, but Ruby saves the day by activating FLIPback prematurely. The Earth's polarity is thus reversed before the Cybermen are ready to deal with the change, and they go out of control while the Doctor and Ruby escape. The Doctor has also been affected by the change, however, and it's up to Ruby to deal with the cobalt bomb. She succeeds by flinging it into the Cybermen's base and bringing the ice tunnels down on their immobile army. The Earth's magnetic polarity then reverses naturally, restoring everything to normal.

The Cyber Controller awakens to find that, since it had conditioned its brain to function in a state of reversed polarity, it is unable to function properly. Emotional memories resurface in its organic brain, and, confused and frustrated, it smashes up the rest of the base and allows Ruby and the Doctor to escape. The Doctor and Ruby flee back to the Jade Pagoda and return the crew and passengers to the Elysium. There, Ruby finds Brack dying of hypothermia, and saves his life by injecting him with the Cybermen's metabolic booster. The Jade Pagoda is about to collapse in upon itself, and as the Doctor prepares to depart, Ruby asks if she can join him. But she realises that she's left her Nanocom in the coat she draped around Brack and when she returns to reclaim it, the Pagoda dematerialises without her.

The arms mentioned in Straker's letter to Brack are the mannequin arms, which are being sent to Panama for an avant-garde sculpture designed by Brack and sponsored by Straker. Brack himself is airlifted to hospital to recuperate from his injuries, and never gets the chance to admit to Ruby that he was the motorcyclist who paralysed her father. Nevertheless, although she will always regret her missed opportunity, her single adventure with the Doctor has given her hope for the future again.

External links
Iceberg Prelude
The Cloister Library - Iceberg

1993 British novels
1993 science fiction novels
Virgin New Adventures
Cybermen novels
Novels set in Antarctica
Seventh Doctor novels
Fiction set in 1994
Fiction set in 2006